The 2011 season was Perak's 8th consecutive season in the Malaysian Super League.

Sponsors

Kit manufacturer
 Specs

Shirt sponsor
 Majlis Bandaraya Ipoh (MBI)

Players

First team squad

Competitions

Super League

League table

FA Cup

The 2011 Malaysia Cup, also known as the Astro Piala FA due to the competition's sponsorship by Astro Arena, involved 30 teams — 16 Super League and 14 Premier League sides.

Knockout stage

Quarter-finals

Malaysia Cup

Group stage

Quarter-finals

Statistics

Top scorers
The list is sorted by shirt number when total goals are equal.
{| class="wikitable sortable" style="font-size: 95%; text-align: center;"
|-
!width=10|
!width=10|
!width=10|
!width=150|Player
!width=50|Super League
!width=50|FA Cup
!width=50|Malaysia Cup
!width=50|Total
|-
|1
|FW
|14
|align=left| Akmal Rizal
|9||4||0||13
|-
|2
|FW
|19
|align=left| Shafiq Jamal
|6||1||4||11
|-
|3
|FW
|23
|align=left| Razali Umar
|4||2||0||6
|-
|4
|FW
|31
|align=left| Failee Ghazli
|0||0||5||5
|-
|rowspan="3"|5
|MF
|8
|align=left| Shahrulnizam Mustapa
|3||1||0||4
|-
|MF
|16
|align=left| Fazrul Hazli
|2||1||1||4
|-
|DF
|19
|align=left| Hazrul Mustafa
|3||1||0||4
|-
|8
|MF
|6
|align=left| Syazwan Roslan
|2||0||0||2
|-
|rowspan="3"|9
|MF
|13
|align=left| Wan Hossen
|1||0||0||1
|-
|MF
|22
|align=left| Isma Alif
|0||1||0||1
|-
|MF
|30
|align=left| Shazuan Mathews
|1||0||0||1
|-
|#
|colspan="3"|Own goals  
|0
|0
|0
|0 
|-class="sortbottom"
|colspan=4|Total
|31
|11
|10
|52

References

Perak F.C. seasons
Malaysian football clubs 2011 season